Kelapa Dua (Indonesian for Two Coconuts) is an administrative village in the Kebon Jeruk district, city of West Jakarta, Indonesia. It has postal code of 11550.

See also 

 Kebon Jeruk
 List of administrative villages of Jakarta

References 

Districts of Jakarta
West Jakarta